Mr. Leonardus Antonius Lightenvelt (27 October 1795, 's-Hertogenbosch – 29 October 1873, Hyères) was a Dutch politician.

References

1795 births
1873 deaths
Ministers of Foreign Affairs of the Netherlands
Ministers of Justice of the Netherlands
Members of the Senate (Netherlands)
Independent politicians in the Netherlands
19th-century Dutch lawyers
People from 's-Hertogenbosch
Leiden University alumni
Commanders of the Order of the Netherlands Lion